Straach is a village and a former municipality in Wittenberg district in Saxony-Anhalt, Germany. Since 1 January 2010, it is part of the town Wittenberg.

Geography
Straach lies about 9 km east of Lutherstadt Wittenberg.

Economy and transportation
Federal Highway (Bundesstraße) B  2 between Berlin and Wittenberg is about 12 km to the east.

Former municipalities in Saxony-Anhalt
Wittenberg